Kustanayevka is a rural locality (a selo) and the administrative center of Kustanayevsky Selsoviet of Belogorsky District, Amur Oblast, Russia. The population was 398 as of 2018. There are 7 streets.

Geography 
Kustanayevka is located 32 km southwest of Belogorsk (the district's administrative centre) by road. Tomichi is the nearest rural locality.

References 

Rural localities in Belogorsky District